Beta Trianguli (Beta Tri, β Trianguli, β Tri) is the Bayer designation for a binary star system in the constellation Triangulum, located about 127 light years from Earth. Although it is only a third-magnitude star, it is the brightest star in the constellation Triangulum.

This is a double-lined spectroscopic binary star system with an orbital period of 31.39 days and an eccentricity of 0.53. The members are separated by a distance of less than 5 AU. The primary component has a stellar classification of A5IV, indicating that it has evolved away from the main sequence and is now a subgiant star. However, the classification is uncertain and not consistent with the mass derived from the orbit. It is among the least variable of the stars that were observed by the Hipparcos spacecraft, with a magnitude varying by only 0.0005.

Based on observations using the Spitzer Space Telescope, as reported in 2005, this system is emitting an excess of infrared radiation. This emission can be explained by a circumbinary ring of dust. The dust is emitting infrared radiation at a blackbody temperature of 100 K. It is thought to extend from 50 to 400 AU away from the stars.

Naming
In combination with Alpha Trianguli, these stars were called Al Mīzān, which is Arabic for "The Scale Beam".

References

Trianguli, Beta
Trianguli, 04
Triangulum (constellation)
0622
013161
010064
BD+34 381
A-type subgiants
Spectroscopic binaries